If We Ever Live Forever is the fifth studio album by the American indie band Longwave. It is Longwave's first album in over a decade. The album was preceded by the release of "Stay with Me" as a single in October 2018. Two more tracks were released as promotional cuts from the album, "Dreamers Float Away" in July 2019 and "If we Ever Live Forever".

Track listing

Personnel
Steve Schiltz – vocals, guitar
Shannon Ferguson – guitar
Christian Bongers – bass
Jason Molina – drums

References

External links
Interview with Schiltz and Ferguson about the new album

Longwave (band) albums
2019 albums